The 2013 Minnesota Swarm season was the ninth season of the Minnesota Swarm, a lacrosse team based in Saint Paul, Minnesota playing in the National Lacrosse League.

The season did not start the way the Swarm might have hoped. Five of their first six games were decided by a single goal, but the Swarm only won two of them. They fell to 3-7 before dominating three straight home games, winning by 7, 9, and 14 goals. They finished at 7-9, good for fifth in the West but thanks to the Buffalo Bandits' 6-10 record, the Swarm crossed over to the Eastern division and made the playoffs.

In the first round, they had another dominating game, defeating the regular season champion Toronto Rock 20-11 in Toronto. But their visit to the Blue Cross Arena in Rochester was less successful, and the eventual champion Knighthawks ended the Swarm's season with a 12-10 win.

Regular season

Final standings

Game log
Reference:

Playoffs

Game log

Roster

Transactions

Trades

Entry Draft
The 2012 NLL Entry Draft took place on October 1, 2012. The Swarm made the following selections:

See also
2013 NLL season

References

Minnesota Swarm seasons
2013 in lacrosse
2013 in sports in Minnesota